is a Japanese voice actress and singer. She is affiliated with Dandelion.

Biography

Filmography

Anime 
 30-sai no Hoken Taiiku - Macaron
 Chikasugi Idol Akae-chan - Akae
 Engaged to the Unidentified - Akane Yonomori
 Ketsuekigata-kun! Featuring Yuri & Nasuno - Yuri Oshimoto
 KiraKira Pretty Cure A La Mode - Crystal Pegasus
 Long Riders! - Emi Kurata
 Mawaru Penguindrum - Hibari Isora
 PriPara - Mikan Shiratama
 Teekyuu - Yuri Oshimoto
 Yuru Yuri San☆Hai!
 Million Doll - Momona
 Nyuru Nyuru!!Kakusen-Kun 2 - Niyuru-Nyan

Games 
 The Idolmaster Million Live - Nao Yokoyama
 Girlfriend(Kari) - Rui Kamijo
 Shooting Girl - B&T APC9 SMG
 Miko No Mori - Sumiyoshi Hiroka

References

External links 
 Official website 

1988 births
Living people
Voice actresses from Osaka Prefecture
People from Minoh, Osaka
Japanese voice actresses